United States v. Rogers, 45 U.S. (4 How.) 567 (1846), was a case in which the Supreme Court of the United States holding that a white man, adopted into an Indian tribe, does not become exempt from the enforcement of the laws prohibiting murder.

Background
William S. Rogers, a white man, was indicted for the murder of Jacob Nicholson, another white man, by the grand jury for the Circuit Court of the United States for the District of Arkansas.  The murder took place in the Indian Territory.  Rogers claimed that he had been adopted into the tribe since his marriage to a Native American (Indian) woman and that he was now part of the Cherokee Tribe.  He claimed that Nicholson had also been adopted into the tribe and was a Cherokee.  Rogers claimed that as an Indian (by adoption), the United States did not have jurisdiction to try him for the murder of another Indian (also by adoption).

Opinion of the Court
Chief Justice Roger B. Taney delivered the opinion of the court.  Taney noted that while the Cherokee nation and their treaties with the United States did have bearing, Rogers was a white man and a citizen of the United States.  Whatever obligations and responsibilities that he incurred by his adoption into the tribe did not negate his obligations and responsibilities to the United States.  Rogers was still a U.S. citizen and subject to federal laws.

References

External links
 

1846 in United States case law
United States Supreme Court cases
United States Supreme Court cases of the Taney Court
United States Native American criminal jurisdiction case law
Criminal cases in the Taney Court
Native American history of Arkansas